Ollie's Follies is a platform game designed by Frank Cohen and published in 1984 by Americana for the Atari 8-bit and Commodore 64 home computers.

Gameplay

The object of the game is to guide the titular "Ollie" through a series of increasingly difficult levels. In each room, the player must make his way through a series of platforms and ramps to an exit that leads to another screen. Some platforms are patrolled by robots, and if Ollie touches one of them, he loses his life. There are energizers scattered throughout the room, which give Ollie the power to touch and destroy robots with impunity.

The screens become increasingly difficult with additional hazards and features. There are large fans that cause Ollie to get blown off ramps, sliding ledges, trampolines, teleports and laser walls. There are a total of 24 rooms. The player wins by getting Ollie through all of them.

Reception
Ollie's Follies was met with fairly good reviews. Zzap!64 reviewers were "pleasantly surprised to find that Ollie’s Follies isn't all that bad", and rated it "Oldie, but goodie platform game". Electronic Games reviewer noted that "Ollie's Follies is a very good game", but he also expressed doubts about how the game would fare in the crowded platform game market.  Bob Chappell writing for Atari User concluded: "Ollie's Follies is very enjoyable and likely to keep you coming back for more until you've cracked it. At the low price it's too good a bargain to miss."

See also

Other games written by Frank Cohen:
 Clowns and Balloons (1982)
 Cohen's Towers (1983)
 Ghost Chaser (1984)
 The Scrolls of Abadon (1984)

References

External links

1984 video games
Atari 8-bit family games
Commodore 64 games
Platform games
Video games about children
Video games about robots
Video games developed in the United States